Fernando Álvarez de Toledo y Pimentel, 3rd Duke of Alba (29 October 150711 December 1582), known as the Grand Duke of Alba in Spain and Portugal and as the Iron Duke ( or shortly 'Alva') in the Netherlands, was a Spanish noble, general and diplomat. He was titled the 3rd Duke of Alba de Tormes, 4th Marquess of Coria, 3rd Count of Salvatierra de Tormes, 2nd Count of Piedrahita, 8th Lord of Valdecorneja, Grandee of Spain and a Knight of the Order of the Golden Fleece. His motto in Latin was Deo patrum nostrorum ("To the God of our fathers").

He was an adviser of King Charles I of Spain (Charles V, Holy Roman Emperor), and his successor, Philip II of Spain, Mayordomo mayor of both, member of their Councils of State and War, governor of the Duchy of Milan (1555–1556), viceroy of the Kingdom of Naples (1556–1558), governor of the Netherlands (1567–1573) and viceroy and constable of the Kingdom of Portugal (1580–1582). He represented Philip II in negotiating Philip's betrothal to Elisabeth of Valois and Anna of Austria, who were the third and fourth (and last) wives of the king.

He has often been considered the most effective general of his generation as well as one of the greatest in military history. Although a tough leader, he was respected by his troops. He touched their sentiments, such as by addressing them in his speeches as "gentlemen soldiers" (señores soldados), but he was also popular among them for daring statements such as the following:

Kings use men like oranges, first they squeeze the juice and then throw away the peel.

Alba first distinguished himself in the conquest of Tunis (1535) during the Ottoman-Habsburg Wars when Charles defeated Hayreddin Barbarossa as part of a long conflict for predominance over the western Mediterranean Sea. He then commanded the Spanish troops at the Battle of Mühlberg (1547), where the army of Emperor Charles defeated the German Protestant princes.

On December 26, 1566, he received the Golden Rose, the blessed sword and hat granted by Pope Pius V, through the papal brief Solent Romani Pontifices, in recognition of his singular efforts in favor of Catholicism and for being considered one of his champions.

He is best known for his actions against the revolt of the Netherlands, where he instituted the Council of Troubles and repeatedly defeated the troops of William of Orange and Louis of Nassau during the first stages of the Eighty Years' War. He is also known for the brutalities during the capture of Mechelen, Zutphen, Naarden and Haarlem. In spite of his military success in the Spanish Netherlands, Alba was recalled to Spain and the Dutch revolt continued. His last military successes were in the Portuguese succession crisis of 1580, winning the Battle of Alcântara.

Early years 

Fernando was born in Piedrahíta, Province of Ávila, on 29 October 1507. He was the son of García Álvarez de Toledo y Zúñiga, heir of Fadrique Álvarez de Toledo y Enríquez de Quiñones, II Duke of Alba de Tormes, and of Beatriz Pimentel, daughter of Rodrigo Alonso Pimentel, IV Count – I Duke of Benavente and his wife, María Pacheco. Fernando was orphaned at age three when his father, García, died during a campaign on the island of Djerba in Africa in 1510. At the age of six, Fernando accompanied his grandfather, the second Duke of Alba, on a military mission to capture Navarre.

His youth and education were typical for Castilian nobility of the age. He was educated at the ducal court of the House of Alba, located in the Castle Palace of Alba de Tormes, by two Italian preceptors, Bernardo Gentilea Sicilian Benedictineand Severo Marini and by the Spanish Renaissance poet and writer Juan Boscan. He was educated in Roman Catholicism and humanism. He mastered Latin and knew French, English and German.

In 1524, when he was seventeen, he joined the troops of Constable of Castile, Íñigo Fernández de Velasco, II Duke of Frías, during the capture of Fuenterrabía, then occupied by France and Navarre. For his role in the siege, Fernando was appointed governor of Fuenterrabía.

When his grandfather Fadrique died in 1531, the ducal title passed to Fernando as the firstborn son of Garcia. Throughout his adulthood, he served the Spanish monarchs Charles I and his successor Philip II.

Mayordomo mayor to the Spanish Kings 
In 1541 Fernando Álvarez de Toledo was named Mayordomo Mayor del Rey de España (High Steward to the King of Spain) by Charles I of Spain.  Alba kept this Office in court until the death of the monarch in 1556.

In 1546, Charles I invested Fernando, the Third Duke of Alba Grand Master as knight of the Illustrious Order of the Golden Fleece.

From 1548 King Charles intensified the preparations of Prince Philip as his successor in the Spanish Monarchy, and he named Duke of Alba mayordomo mayor of his son to prepare Philip for his new role. Fernando took Philip on a tour around Europe that lasted until 1551. Fernando accompanied Philip to England to attend his marriage to Mary Tudor. The Duke was one of fifteen grandees of Spain who attended the ceremony in the abbey of Winchester on 25 July 1554.

After the death of Charles, the new King Philip II maintained Fernando, Third Duke of Alba, as mayordomo mayor until the death of the Duke in 1582.

In 1563, King Philip II created the title Duke of Huéscar to be bestowed on the heir of the Dukes of Alba. Fadrique Álvarez de Toledo, son of Fernando became 1st Duke of Huéscar.

In 1566, Alba's son and heir, Fadrique, broke his promise of marriage to Magdalena de Guzman, lady of Queen Anne of Austria, which led to his arrest and imprisonment in the Castle of La Mota in Valladolid. The following year he was released so he could go to Flanders with his father to serve in the military. In 1578 Philip II ordered the case against Fadrique reopened. It was discovered that in order to avoid marriage, Fadrique had secretly married María de Toledo, daughter of García Álvarez de Toledo and Osorio, IV Marquess of Villafranca del Bierzo, using a permit issued for that purpose by his father the Duke of Alba. Fadrique was sent to prison, in the Castle of La Mota. Fernando, Duke of Alba was banished from the court for one year for "breaking the strict court protocol." The Duke went into exile in Uceda, where his secretaries Fernando de Albornoz and Esteban Ibarra likewise spent their punishment.

Military commands

Against the Ottomans and French (1532–42) 
After Fernando had become the third Duke of Alba in 1532, Charles V sent him to Vienna to help defend the city against an Ottoman invasion army. No battle ensued as the Ottomans, having lost momentum due to time lost during the Siege of Güns, decided not to advance against Vienna and retreated from the field.

During this time, he was accompanied by the soldier-poet  Garcilaso de la Vega throughout his travels in Europe. The special access that De La Vega had as a close companion to Alba, coupled with his skilled craft as a writer, allows the historian to delve into the deepest emotions expressed by the Duke of Alba through the poetry of De La Vega. Specifically concerning the ardegous travels while on a war-footing as well as the emotional longing that Alba expressed for his wife.

The Duke's first military command to engage in battle was in the conquest of Tunis. In early June 1535 at Cagliari, he embarked with the military force commanded by the Marquess of Vasto. On 14 July, the fortress of La Goleta was seized, and a week later the army took the city of Tunis which was defended by Hayreddin Barbarossa. Thus Spain regained control over the western Mediterranean Sea.

In 1542, he led the Spanish troops against the French Army, ending the siege of Perpignan. The siege was a decisive victory for Alba and one of the worst defeats of Francis I during the French offensive of 1542.

In Germany (1546–47) 
In 1547, Charles I, in his capacity as Charles V, Holy Roman Emperor engaged with the Protestant forces in the Schmalkaldic War. The Duke of Alba was in charge of Tercios, the elite Spanish ground troops during the Battle of Mühlberg on the banks of the river Elbe. A flanking attack by Alba's Tercios was largely responsible for the imperial army's decisive victory against the Elector of Saxony.

In Milan and Naples (1555–59) 

In later years, the focus of conflict between France and Spain had moved to the Italian peninsula. Alba was sent to Italy as commander in chief of the Spanish-Habsburg army in Italy, and became governor of Milan in 1555, and viceroy of Naples in 1556.

The newly appointed Pope Paul IV, an enemy of the Habsburgs, prompted King Henry II of France to expel the Spanish from Italy. Papal troops joined the French for this aim. In July 1556 the Pope declared Philip II was removed from the title King of Naples. Alba did not hesitate and marched on Rome at the head of 12,000 Spanish soldiers. He financed the campaign, in part, by obtaining a loan of 430,000 ducats from Bona Sforza, dowager Queen of Poland; the loan became known as Neapolitan sums and was never repaid. The Pope called for a truce, giving time for a French army commanded by Francis, Duke of Guise to march on Naples. The Spanish intercepted the French and defeated them in the Battle of San Quentin. Without French support, the papal troops were overwhelmed by the Spanish and the Duke of Alba entered Rome in September 1557. The pope had to sue for peace.

In April 1559, Alba was one of the signatories of the Treaty of Cateau-Cambrésis which ended their war with France and released Spanish resources for maximising its economic exploitation of New Spain. The Italian peninsula entered a prolonged period of peace, sealed by marriage between the twice widowed Philip II and Isabel de Valois, daughter of Henry II of France. During the royal wedding, which was held in Paris, Alba acted as proxy for Philip.

Governor of the Netherlands (1567–73) 

From August to October 1566, the "Iconoclasm" took place in the Netherlands, during which Calvinist mobs attacked and destroyed numerous Catholic monasteries and churches, ransacking tombs and destroying statues. To tackle the civil and religious rebels, King Philip II sent Alba to Brussels on 22 August 1567, at the head of a powerful army. Upon arrival, he replaced Margaret of Parma, the sister of the Spanish king, as head of the civil jurisdiction. He decided that the local nobility was in open rebellion against the king and supported the new Protestant teachings. Heresy in his view.

A few days later, on 5 September 1567, Alba established the "Council of Troubles", popularly known in the Netherlands as the "Court of Blood," to prosecute those responsible for the riots of 1566, especially those deemed heretics. Alba also targeted the local Catholic nobles who favoured dialogue and who opposed outside intervention. Two of the three heads of Flemish nobility, the Count of Egmont, a Catholic General for Philip II, who had led the cavalry that defeated the French at the Battle of San Quentin, and Philip de Montmorency, Count of Horn, were arrested. The court sentenced both counts to death. The Mayor of Antwerp, Anthony van Stralen, Lord of Merksem and Jan van Casembroot were other famous victims of the bloody repression, along with a large group of other apostates. Those condemned were executed on 5 June 1568 in the Town Hall Square in Brussels. Alba had little confidence in Flemish justice, which he perceived as sympathetic to the defendants, and witnessed the executions in person.

The maintenance of the troops in Flanders entailed substantial economic costs. The Duke decided to impose new taxes on the population. Some cities, including Utrecht, refused to pay and declared a rebellion, which quickly spread throughout the Netherlands. William the Silent, the prince of Orange, enlisted the help of the French Huguenots; and started to actively support the rebellion. William and the Huguenots took many Dutch cities. The Spanish troops advanced under banners with the Latin legend Pro lege, rege, et grege, which in English means For the law, the king, and the people [literally, the flock]. 
In 1572 the Spanish army carried out the Spanish Fury at Mechelen, retaking and sacking the city after the rebel garrison had left. From there, they retook Zutphen and Naarden. The Spanish Siege of Haarlem, characterized by brutality and savagery on both sides, culminated in the surrender of the city and the execution of all the garrison, estimated at 2,000 men. The subsequent Siege of Alkmaar was unsuccessful however. The first defeat in a full scale engagement for the Spanish troops during the Dutch revolt. The prolonged military campaigns and the harsh repression of the rebel citizenry earned the 3rd Duke of Alba the nickname "The Iron Duke" in the Netherlands, and he became an important element of the anti-Spanish Black Legend. His reputation was used for propaganda purposes by rebel statesman Philips of Marnix, Lord of Saint-Aldegonde to further strengthen anti-Spanish sentiments in the Netherlands.

In spite of continuous military action, the political situation in the Netherlands had not turned in favour of the Spanish crown. After five years of repression, more than 5,000 executions and numerous complaints to the Spanish court, Philip II decided to change policy and relieve the Duke. The monarch sent Luis de Requesens to replace him. De Requesens tried to appease the situation by giving concessions to the rebels. Alba returned to Spain in 1573.

Nevertheless, the Duke still had influence in the Royal Council. Alba belonged to the conservative Spanish faction called Albistas or imperialists. This faction included the Inquisitor General Fernando de Valdés y Salas, the House of Pimentel, the Duke de Alburquerque and other members of the House of Álvarez de Toledo. The Albistas advised the king to take a firm stand in the Netherlands. The Albistas' hardline position was hotly contested by the liberal Ebolistas or humanists, led by Ruy Gómez de Silva, prince of Éboli and his secretary Francisco de Eraso. After the death of the prince of Éboli in 1573, the royal secretary Antonio Pérez went on to lead the liberal faction and began his association with Ana de Mendoza de la Cerda, Princess of Éboli. Against the Albistas' urging, King Philip II himself publicly acknowledged that "it is not possible to carry Flanders forward by way of war."  Political concessions by Luis de Requesens failed to end the rebellion in the Netherlands and hostilities soon resumed. These failures of the Ebolistas to end the Dutch revolt raised the distrust of the king, and Philip II again granted the Duke of Alba an important position in court.

Portuguese succession (1580–82) 

After the death of King Sebastian of Portugal, who had no heirs, in the Battle of Alcácer Quibir in 1578, the crown fell to his great uncle Cardinal Henry I of Portugal. The death of the latter, without any appointed heirs, led to the Portuguese succession crisis of 1580.

One of the claimants to the throne, António, Prior of Crato, a bastard son of Infante Louis, Duke of Beja and only grandson through the male line of king Manuel I of Portugal, was proclaimed King in June 1580.

Philip II, through his mother Isabella of Portugal also a grandson of Manuel I, did not recognize Antonio as king of Portugal.
The king appointed Fernando, Duke of Alba, as captain general of his army.  The duke was 73 years old and ill at the time. Fernando mustered his forces, estimated at 20,000 men, in Badajoz, and in June 1580 crossed the Spanish-Portuguese border and moved to Lisbon. In late August he defeated a Portuguese army at the Battle of Alcântara and entered Lisbon. This cleared the way for Philip II who became Philip I of Portugal, and created a dynastic union spanning all of Iberia under the Spanish crown.

King Philip II rewarded Fernando with the titles of 1st Viceroy of Portugal and Constable of Portugal on July 18, 1580. With these titles Fernando represented the Spanish monarch in Portugal and was second in hierarchy only after the king in Portugal. Fernando held both titles until his death in 1582.

Marriage and children 
His first child, Fernando de Toledo (1527–1591), was an illegitimate son with a miller's daughter in the town of La Aldehuela.

27 April 1529 the Duke married his cousin María Enríquez de Toledo y Guzmán (died 1583), daughter of Diego Enríquez de Guzmán, III Count of Alba de Liste, with whom he had four children.

García Álvarez de Toledo y Enríquez de Guzmán (1530–1548)
Fadrique Álvarez de Toledo y Enríquez de Guzman, IV Duke of Alba (1537–1585)
Diego Álvarez de Toledo y Enríquez de Guzmán (1541–1583), Count of Lerín and Constable of Navarre by his marriage, held on 24 March 1565, with Brianda Beaumont (1540–1588), daughter of Luis de Beaumont. He was succeeded by Antonio Álvarez de Toledo y Beaumont, V Duke of Alba de Tormes (1568–1639)
Beatriz Álvarez de Toledo y Enríquez de Guzmán (died 1637), married Álvaro Pérez Osorio, V Marquess of Astorga.

Later years and death 
Alba died in Lisbon on 11 December 1582, at the age of seventy-five; he was given the last rites by the famous Luis de Granada.

His remains were transferred to Alba de Tormes, where he was buried in the convent of San Leonardo. In 1619 they were transferred to the Convento de San Esteban, Salamanca. In 1983 a mausoleum was erected over his grave, funded by the Provincial Deputation of Salamanca.

Ache War reference 

In 1904 there was in the Dutch press and House of Representatives an intensive debate on the conduct of Gotfried Coenraad Ernst van Daalen, a Dutch commander who during the then current Aceh War was charged with the killing of numerous civilians, including women and children, during the conquest of Aceh in northern Sumatra. Some of van Daalen's detractors compared his conduct with the atrocities committed by the Duke of Alba, still well remembered in Dutch historical memory.

Ancestry

Notes

Bibliography 

 
 
 Falcó y Osorio, María del Rosario. Duquesa de Berwick y de Alba. Catálogo de las colecciones expuestas en las vitrinas del Palacio de Liria. Madrid. 1898.
 Fernández Álvarez, Manuel. El duque de hierro: Fernando Álvarez de Toledo, III de Alba. Colección Espasa Forum. Espasa Calpé. Madrid. 2007. .
 Kamen, Henry. The Duke of Alba. New Haven, Yale, 2004. 
 Kamen, Henry. El gran duque de Alba. Cuarta edición, cartoné. La Esfera de los Libros. Madrid. 2004/7. .
 Maltby, William S. Alba: A Biography of Fernando Alvarez de Toledo, Third Duke of Alba, 1507–1582. University of California Press. 1983. .
 Maltby, William S. El gran duque de Alba. Prólogo Jacobo Siruela, traducción Eva Rodríguez Halffter. Segunda edición. Ediciones Atalanta. Vilaür. 2007. .
 Junta de Castilla y León. Consejería de Educación y Cultura. Los Álvarez de Toledo Nobleza viva. María del Pilar García Pinacho. España. 1998. .
 Alba, General and Servant to the Crown. Edited by Maurits Ebben, Margriet Lacy-Bruijn and Rolof van Hövell tot Westerflier. Karwansaray. 2013. .

External links

1507 births
1582 deaths
16th-century Spanish military personnel
Fernando 03
Fernando 03
Eighty Years' War (1566–1609)
Governors of the Habsburg Netherlands
Grandees of Spain
Fernando 03
Knights of the Golden Fleece
Catholicism-related controversies
Spanish generals
Spanish people of the Eighty Years' War
Spanish politicians
Spanish Roman Catholics
Portuguese Roman Catholics
Viceroys of Naples
Viceroys of Portugal
Viceroys of Catalonia
16th-century military history of Spain